World of Wonder Productions is an American production company founded in 1991 by filmmakers Randy Barbato and Portsmouth-born Fenton Bailey. Based in Los Angeles, California, the company specializes in documentary television and film productions with a key focus on sexuality, erotica, and the sexual subculture. Together, Bailey and Barbato have produced programming through World of Wonder for HBO, Bravo, HGTV, Showtime, the BBC, Netflix, MTV and VH1, with credits including the Million Dollar Listing docuseries, RuPaul's Drag Race, and the documentary films Mapplethorpe: Look at the Pictures (2016) and The Eyes of Tammy Faye (2000).

World of Wonder is perhaps best known for its contributions towards LGBTQ programming, for which they won an Outfest Annual Achievement Award in 2011. Their most well known LGBTQ production is RuPaul's Drag Race, having managed the career of drag queen and titular host RuPaul for many years before this, eventually producing the franchise alongside the majority of its live shows, podcasts, television specials, and conventions.

History 

Bailey and Barbato co-founded World of Wonder after meeting in NYU's graduate film program in the mid 1980s, where they initially formed a disco pop rock duo called the Fabulous Pop Tarts under their record label, World of Wonder (with the name coming from a British comic book Bailey used to get as a child). Bailey and Barbato began performing regularly at Danceteria and other clubs in downtown New York City. They produced two albums, Age of the Thing which included their hit single New York City Beat, and Gagging on the Lovely Extravaganza, which included guest appearances by Lady Miss Kier, RuPaul, Martyn Phillips, and Filthy the Dog.

World of Wonder initially acted as a management vehicle for the Fabulous Pop Tarts, organising projects in television production and licensing, documentary filmmaking, and the career expansion of their friends and fellow artists, particularly RuPaul, whom they met in Atlanta in the 1980s and have continued to work with. They produced RuPaul's first album, "RuPaul is StarBooty", in 1986, and became his manager shortly after launching World of Wonder in 1991. They have since produced all of his television shows, his DragCon bi-coastal conventions and music productions, and have earned multiple Emmy Awards.

World of Wonder shares its name with one of its early television documentaries, Died on the 4th of July: Nelson Sullivan's World of Wonder. Nelson Sullivan was a central figure in the downtown New York City art and club scene of the 1980s, obsessively videotaping everyone and everything he saw before dying of a heart attack on July 4, 1989. Sullivan left behind over 1200 hours of video footage taken over the last decade of his life. From this archive, World of Wonder created a one-hour documentary portrait of Sullivan, which aired on UK's Channel 4, and was also included on the DVD release of Party Monster: The Shockumentary. Based, in part, on this documentary, Sullivan continued to gain posthumous respect as a noted historian, with his videos gaining a younger and wider viewership following their upload to YouTube. The early focus on Sullivan formed the basis of the company's ongoing interest in documentary filmmaking. In 2014, Bailey and Barbato were honored with the IDA Pioneer Award, "celebrating exceptional achievement, leadership, and vision in the nonfiction and documentary community".

World of Wonder operates out of a historical art-deco building on Hollywood Boulevard. Designed by architects S. Tilden Norton and Fredrick H. Wallis and erected in 1930, the building served as the original home of the Directors Guild of America. The World of Wonder Storefront Gallery now occupies the ground floor retail space, with production and management offices occupying the upper three stories. The basement, once home to the punk rock club The Masque, now houses the company's video archive and a soundstage.

Television 
World of Wonder primarily produces television content for networks in the US and UK, including BBC, Channel 4, FIVE, HBO, Cinemax, TLC, PBS, Showtime, A&E, MTV, VH1 and Bravo. Productions over the past three decades include RuPaul's Drag Race, Manhattan Cable with Laurie Pike, The Adam and Joe Show,Tori & Dean: Inn Love, Good Work, Million Dollar Listing, docuseries, Heli-Loggers, Pam Anderson: Girl on the Loose, Big Freedia, and Island Hunters. World of Wonder also produced the documentary series One Punk Under God, Sex Change Hospital, and TransGeneration, one of the first unscripted television shows to focus on the Trans community, which won the 2006 GLAAD Award for Outstanding Documentary.

Another franchise by WOW, Million Dollar Listing, debuted in LA in 2006 and has since expanded to include New York, San Francisco and Miami series. The spin-off, Sell It Like Serhant, featuring one of Million Dollar Listing New York's top broker, Ryan Serhant launched in 2018. In 2021, World of Wonder produced Catch and Kill: The Podcast Tapes also directed by Bailey and Barbato, and Small Town News: KPVM Pahrump for HBO. The company have also received several Emmy nominations for their documentary programming.

RuPaul's Drag Race 
The production company produced The RuPaul Show, hosted by RuPaul. RuPaul pitched a show with World of Wonder to Logo TV, and they immediately picked the show up for a season. The reality television was called: RuPaul's Drag Race, which aired in February 2009. They also produced a spinoff series called, RuPaul's Drag U, which only lasted for three seasons. RuPaul's Drag Race: All Stars was produced by World of Wonder, and was released through Logo TV. RuPaul's Drag Race: Untucked, a behind-the-scenes after show which is aired following each new episode of the original series.

World of Wonder's work in television has been honored with over two dozen Emmy nominations and multiple wins for RuPaul's Drag Race, including awards for best overall in the reality category and best host.

Documentary Films 
World of Wonder has produced many feature-length documentaries on provocative subjects over the years, several of which have garnered industry awards and nominations. These include Inside Deep Throat, which premiered at Sundance; the HBO biopic Wishful Drinking, starring Carrie Fisher and received two Emmy nominations; and Becoming Chaz, which premiered at Sundance as the OWN network's first-ever documentary and was nominated for three Emmys. They also produced the feature films Party Monster starring Macaulay Culkin and Seth Green, and Menendez: Blood Brothers starring Courtney Love, Nico Tortorella, Benito Martinez and Myko Olivier.

Bailey and Barbato have produced a host of other original documentaries, including Party Monster: The Shockumentary, which won an editing Emmy; The Eyes of Tammy Faye, Monica in Black and White, Gender Revolution with Katie Couric, and The Last Beekeeper. In 2017, Out of Iraq, their documentary chronicling the relationship between two enlisted men serving in Iraq won a daytime Emmy for Logo TV. In March 2018, the documentary When the Beat Drops, directed by Jamal Sims, premiered at the Miami International Film Festival, where it won the Knight Documentary Achievement Award. In 2018, World of Wonder produced and directed an HBO documentary examining the history of the Statue of Liberty, “Liberty: Mother of Exiles.” The company was also commissioned by YouTube to create Stonewall Outloud, a documentary based on the Stonewall gay rights protests of 1969, using the audio recordings of StoryCorps founder, Dave Isay.

Content 
Over the years, World of Wonder expanded its presence into new media types, including conventions, video-on-demand, social media, and blogging. The WOW Report, a blog providing daily coverage of the pop culture and nightlife sectors and was named Best Counter Culture Blog by LA Weekly in 2011.

In 2015, World of Wonder added conventions to their portfolio, which started the launch of RuPaul's DragCon LA, located at the Los Angeles Convention Center. The largest celebration of drag art and culture in the world with over 50,000 attendees, they launched RuPaul's DragCon NYC in the city's Javits Convention Center in 2017, where it was a complete sell-out. In 2020, they have expanded to London, which they launched RuPaul's DragCon UK in 2020. Due to the COVID-19 pandemic, RuPaul's DragCon LA went online as Digital DragCon.

In 2018, World of Wonder hosts their own award show called, the WOWIE Awards, which celebrates "the very best in entertain(t)ment, LGBTQ + artistry, glamazonian realness, and thirst traps". In January 2020, the production company began their first Las Vegas Strip residency called: RuPaul's Drag Race Live!, where former drag queen contestants from the Drag Race franchise performed at the Flamingo Las Vegas, directed by RuPaul and Jamal Sims.

World of Wonder has a YouTube channel with the name, "WOWPresents", which features over 3,000 videos and has more than 1.7 million subscribers.

WOW Presents Plus 

In November 2017, World of Wonder launched the subscription streaming service WOW  Presents Plus. The service contains a multitude of original series and live events, along with new original material spanning the realm of pop culture and LGBTQ society. Its exclusive original series include: Sketchy Queens, UNHhhh, and Painted with Raven. The service is also the main international distributor in some regions for RuPaul's Drag Race and its international incarnations of the franchises. It also includes many web series found on WOWPresents' YouTube channel, such as Detox's Life Rehab and La Vida de Valentina.

Awards 

 The company blog, The WOW Report, was named "Best Counter Culture Blog" by LA Weekly in 2011.
 Million Dollar Listing New York was a 2015 Emmy Award nominee for Outstanding Unstructured Reality Program.
 RuPaul's Drag Race won the 2014 TCA Award for Outstanding Achievement in Reality Programming.
 Big Freedia (Fuse) won the 2014 GLAAD Media Award for Outstanding Reality Program.
 Barbato and Bailey were given the IDA Pioneer Award in December 2014.
 Mapplethorpe: Look at the Pictures was nominated for two awards at the 2016 Emmy awards, for "Outstanding Cinematography For A Nonfiction Program" and "Outstanding Documentary or Nonfictional Special".
 World of Wonder won a Daytime Emmy Award in May 2017 for Out of Iraq, a documentary on Logo TV.
 RuPaul's Drag Race has been nominated for twenty-nine Emmy Awards and has won thirteen, including Outstanding Host for a Reality Series in 2016 and the same award in 2017 along with Outstanding Makeup and Outstanding Editing.
 When the Beat Drops - Knight Documentary Achievement Award in 2017.
 UNHhhh has been nominated for two Streamy Awards for Show of the Year and Best Unscripted series in 2017 and 2019.

References

Further reading

External links 
 

Film production companies of the United Kingdom
Film production companies of the United States
Television production companies of the United Kingdom
Television production companies of the United States
World of Wonder (company)